Teodolinda Rosa Rodrigues Coelho is the Angolan ambassador to Austria and the United Nations in Vienna.

She earned a law degree from Agostinho Neto University in Luanda (1989) and graduated from the United Nations Institute for Training and Research in Diplomatic Practice and Negotiation, New York (2004).

References

Ambassadors of Angola to Austria
Agostinho Neto University alumni
Living people
Angolan women ambassadors
Permanent Representatives of Angola to the United Nations
Year of birth missing (living people)